"Ready for the Night" is a song by Belgian DJ Laurent Wéry, from his debut album Ready for the Night. The song was written by Serge Ramaekers, Johan Waem, Laurent Wery. It was released in Belgium as a digital download on 22 July 2010.

Track listing
 Digital download
 "Ready for the Night" (Radio Edit) - 2:50
 "Ready for the Night" (Extended Club Mix) - 5:56
 "Ready for the Night" (A Capella) - 2:28

Credits and personnel
Lyrics – Serge Ramaekers, Johan Waem, Laurent Wery
Label: La Musique du Beau Monde

Chart performance

Release history

References

External links
 Official Website
 Laurent Wery on Facebook

2010 singles
Laurent Wéry songs
2010 songs
Songs written by Laurent Wéry